Every Child Ministries is a Christian charity and mission agency that works for African children.  The charity is specially known for its advocacy on behalf of neglected, downtrodden, and marginalized groups of African children.  It was first incorporated in the US in the state of Indiana in 1985, but is now incorporated and recognized as an NGO in numerous African countries.

Programs 

Initiative for street children (DR Congo, Ghana, Uganda)

Vocational apprenticeship for street youth (DR Congo, Ghana, Uganda)

Haven of Hope Children's Home (Ghana)

Haven of Hope Academy (Ghana)

Educational assistance for orphans & vulnerable children through sponsorship (DR Congo, Uganda, Ghana) and educational gift sets 

Special helps programs for persons with albinism (Uganda)

Training for teachers of children and youth (DR Congo, Ghana, Uganda)

Intensive 9-month training for “teachers of teachers” (Spécialisation en Education Chrétienne) African Leadership Training Center DR Congo

Leadership training (DR Congo, Ghana, Uganda)

Teachers’ resource libraries (DR Congo)

Development & publication of uplifting literature on health themes, education, literacy, and spiritual values (DR Congo, Uganda)

Kids’ Clubs & Sunday Schools for children (DR Congo, Ghana, Uganda)

Health services (DR Congo, Uganda)

Restoration of underage victims of commercial sexual exploitation (Ghana)

Child sponsorship (DR Congo, Ghana, Uganda)

"The Way Home"--"forever" homes and other assistance for AIDS orphans and grandmothers rearing them (Uganda)

Main fields of service 

DR Congo (formerly Zaire) since 1985

Ghana since 1999

Uganda since 2006

History 

Every Child Ministries (ECM, sometimes called ECMAfrica) was founded by John and Lorella Rouster in 1985 after serving three years in what was then Zaire with another evangelical mission.    John had an agricultural background and later earned a Biblical studies certificate from Moody Bible Institute. Lorella was a teacher, Christian educator, and journalist, also an alumna of Moody Bible Institute, Tri-State University(B.A.)and Covington Theological Seminary (M.R.E.)  The Rousters served a total of nine years in Zaire (now DR Congo)—a little more than three before founding ECM (1981-Spring 1984) and six with ECM (1990–1996).    During this time Lorella wrote numerous books in the African Kituba language, translated songs, Gospel and health booklets, which were published by ECM.  She also developed an extensive training manual for teachers of children.  This book was later published in seven languages spoken in Africa:  Kituba, Lingala, Tshiluba, French, English, Spanish, Portuguese.
 
From 1985 to 1998, Every Child Ministries served only in DR Congo and was mainly limited to Christian education, training of teachers, development of literature, and health services.  In 1985 ECM was featured in the "Mission Explorers Video Series" with Carey Kinsolving.  These ministries have continued and expanded under national leadership.

In 1990 ECM established Mission Garizim in Congo and opened its African Leadership Training Center in 2001, training "teachers of teachers" for Congo and other French-speaking African countries.

Since 1999 three tendencies have been noticeable:  1.  Rapid expansion into other African countries, and 2. A growing tendency to focus on the needs of what the organization deems as the most marginalized and neglected children, 3. A growing emphasis on Child sponsorship.

In 1997 the Rousters returned from Congo.  Floyd Bertsch had served as International Director while the Rousters were in Congo, but upon their return they again took the position of International Director, sharing the duties as co-directors.

In 1999 an evaluatory trip was made to Ghana.  As a result, several initiatives were established there including the Initiative against shrine slavery ritual servitude and the Initiative for Street children.

In 2001 ECM initiated a program called "Character Building from the Bible" in some of the public schools of Ghana.

In November 2002 Haven of Hope Home/orphanage was founded.  Forty-five children now find a safe haven there.  Many were homeless street children, some are orphans, abandoned children, former shrine slaves and children of former slaves. The home now includes a school, Haven of Hope Academy, offering Nursery through Class 6.

In January 2003 Every Child Ministries held its first liberation of shrine slaves known as trokosi, cooperating with International Needs Ghana.  This was followed by another liberation in January 2004 in cooperation with FESLIM (Fetish Slaves Liberation Movement), a third in December 2005, and another in March 2010. ECM was very active in advocating for the abolition of the practice and the liberation of existing slaves. In 2007 they released a DVD for their anti-slavery project called "Stomp Out Slavery" to help raise public awareness. In January 2008, ECM issued a "Prayer Guide against Modern Slavery" in celebration of the 150th anniversary of the Emancipation Proclamation

In 2003 ECM expanded its ministry to street children to include DR Congo, ministering to children living on Kinshasa's streets with meals twice a week, vocational training, literacy classes, sports teams, gardening and Bible classes.

The same year they introduced an in-depth method of teaching the Bible.  Called "Step by Step, Slowly", the approach teaches Bible passages phrase by phrase involving a four-step process—Read, Question, Act it out, Sing and Dance.

In 2006 ECM made investigatory trips into Togo, Benin, Uganda, and New Sudan, and conducted training for children's teachers in Uganda and New Sudan.

This was followed by training for children's teachers in Togo in 2007 and in Benin in 2008, and by the establishment of a main base of operations with numerous projects in Uganda in 2007–2008.

Initial projects in Uganda included summer day camps and holiday parties for children in IDP camps, an initiative to help albino children and improve public acceptance of them, and "The Way Home" Project targeting AIDS orphans.  "The Way Home" project began in 2010 with assistance to "grannies" raising several grandchildren who were orphaned due to AIDS.  Additional projects have been started around the country, including Tororo, Napak, Lwengo, and various sections of Kampala.

On January 1, 2015, Mark Luckey was named as International Executive Director, succeeding the Rousters, who continued serving in positions as missionary consultants, project advisors, and communications specialists.  John retired from missionary service on October 1, 2016, but continues to volunteer at the ECM home office and travel annually to Congo.

Missiology
Every Child Ministries is a nonsectarian Christian mission of evangelical persuasion. Its members come from many different Christian churches.  It is a hands-on type mission making extensive use of volunteers and involving people from many different backgrounds.    As a mission agency ECM sends both career and short-term missionaries and widely supports the work of African nationals.

Memberships and affiliations
Every Child Ministries has been a member of the Evangelical Council for Financial Accountability since 1987, the Better Business Bureau Wise Giving Alliance,  and Mission Network News. It is also a member of STEER, a group that involves agriculturalists in mission support.  and the Christian Leadership Alliance.  
ECM has participated in the triennial Urbana (convention) Student Missions Conference, where Co-Director Lorella Rouster taught a 2006 seminar on “Healing the Children of War.”, and the Moody Bible Institute Mission's Conference.  The organization has also regularly participated in the Greater Chicago Sunday School Association, where they have presented many workshops for teachers. In 2005 they were the featured international ministry at the Children's Pastor's Conferences sponsored by the International Network of Children's Ministry.

References

External links
ECM Official website 
ECM Teaching Resources for African Churches & Teachers
The Way Home Project website

Children's charities based in the United States
Religious organizations based in the United States
Development charities based in the United States
Organizations established in 1985
Christian missions in Africa
1985 establishments in Zaire